Lurosetron (INN) is a serotonin 5-HT3 receptor antagonist.

Synthesis

References

5-HT3 antagonists
Imidazoles
Gamma-Carbolines